The Last Porno Flick (also known as Those Mad, Mad Moviemakers) is an American 1974 film starring Marianna Hill and directed by Ray Marsh.

Plot
Two young men wishing to make an adult film raise money from family and friends by claiming that they are making a religious movie.

Cast
Frank Calcanini as Tony
Michael Pataki as Ziggy
Mike Kellin as Boris
Marianna Hill as Mary
Jo Anne Meredith as Jessica
Robyn Hilton as Linda Loveman
Tom Signorelli as O.D.
Carmen Zapata as Mama Theresa
Antony Carbone as Vittorio
Raf Mauro as Gaffer

See also
 List of American films of 1974

References

External links

1974 films
Films about pornography
1974 comedy films
1970s English-language films
American comedy films
Films with screenplays by Larry DiTillio
1970s American films